Cyclogomphus gynostylus is a species of dragonfly in the family Gomphidae. It is endemic to Sri Lanka.  Its natural habitats are rivers, water storage areas, and canals and ditches. It is threatened by habitat loss.

References

Dragonflies of Sri Lanka
Gomphidae
Insects described in 1926
Taxonomy articles created by Polbot